This is a list of mayors of Aliso Viejo in Orange County, California — since its incorporation in 2001.

List

History of city council
When Aliso Viejo was first incorporated as a city in 2001, five city council members were elected to serve terms.  Carmen Vali was chosen to serve as the city's first mayor because she was instrumental in getting the city incorporated; and Cynthia Pickett was chosen to serve as the city's mayor pro tem.  Both were reelected in November 2006 to terms ending in 2010.  Both women later married during their terms, with Carmen Vali becoming Carmen Vali-Cave and Cynthia Pickett becoming Cynthia Adams.

Also elected in 2001 were Bill Phillips, Karl Warkomski, and Greg Ficke.  Each of these candidates were re-elected to serve on City Council in 2004 to terms ending in 2008.

A new mayor is selected from the five city council members each year.

So far, Ficke is the only member of the original council to never have served as mayor, while Cynthia Adams and Carmen Vali-Cave are the only original members to have served as mayor for more than one term.  Until Warkomski's resignation in February 2007 and Adams's resignation three months later, all five current city council members had been the only five to have served on city council since the city's incorporation.

References

External links 
Elected Officials of Aliso Viejo — Official list from the City of Aliso Viejo.

People from Aliso Viejo, California
Aliso Viejo, California
Government in Orange County, California
M